was a city located in Fukushima Prefecture, Japan.

As of 2003, the city had an estimated population of 48,234 and a density of 243.00 persons per km². The total area was 198.49 km².

On January 1, 2006, Haramachi, along with the towns of Kashima and Odaka (both from Sōma District), was merged to create the city of Minamisōma.

The city was founded on March 20, 1954.

Dissolved municipalities of Fukushima Prefecture